Villadia is a genus of plants in the family Crassulaceae. It includes about 25 to 30 species distributed from Texas to Peru.

Synonyms
Altamiranoa was a genus of the Crassulaceae, that Joseph Nelson Rose proposed in the early 1900s for 12 Mexican species, three described as new and nine formerly in Cotyledon, Sedum, or Umbilicus. The name was dedicated to Fernando Altamirano, a Mexican physician, botanist and naturalist that co-worked with J. N. Rose.

Baehni (1937) united the genus Altamiranoa with Villadia, but Walther (1938) refuted the argument and proposed the combined genus be called species of Altamiranoa are best dispersed in Sedum genus, but maintained the differences with genus Villadia.

Species listed under Altamiranoa include:

Altamiranoa albiflora (Villadia albiflora)
Altamiranoa alpina
Altamiranoa batesii (Villadia batesii)
Altamiranoa berillonana
Altamiranoa calcicola
Altamiranoa chihuahuensis (Sedum chihuahuensis)
Altamiranoa cucullata (Villadia cucullata)
Altamiranoa decipiens
Altamiranoa diffusa
Altamiranoa dyvrandae
Altamiranoa elongata (Sedum jurgensenii)
Altamiranoa erecta
Altamiranoa ericoides
Altamiranoa fusca
Altamiranoa galeottiana
Altamiranoa goldmanii (Sedum goldmanii)
Altamiranoa grandyi (Sedum grandyi)
Altamiranoa guatemalensis (Villadia guatemalensis)
Altamiranoa hemsleyana
Altamiranoa imbricata (Villadia imbricata)
Altamiranoa incarum (Villadia incarum)
Altamiranoa jurgensenii (Sedum jurgensenii)
Altamiranoa levis
Altamiranoa mexicana
Altamiranoa minutiflora (Villadia minutiflora)
Altamiranoa montana
Altamiranoa necaxana
Altamiranoa nelsonii (Villadia nelsonii)
Altamiranoa batesii
Altamiranoa painteri (Villadia painteri)
Altamiranoa parva
Altamiranoa parviflora
Altamiranoa pringlei (Villadia pringlei)
Altamiranoa ramosissima
Altamiranoa ramulos
Altamiranoa ramulosa
Altamiranoa scopulina (Sedum scopulinum)
Altamiranoa squamulosa (Villadia squamulosa)
Altamiranoa stricta
Altamiranoa virgata
Altamiranoa weberbaueri

Crassulaceae
Crassulaceae genera